The Russian First Division 2008 was the 17th edition of Russian First Division. There were 22 teams.

Teams
15 clubs placed 3–17 in 2007 Russian First Division, 2 clubs relegated from 2007 Russian Premier League and 5 zone winners from Russian Second Division 2007 took part in the league:

On 23 October 2008 FC Zvezda Irkutsk had to stop participation in the league due to lack of funds, their main sponsor Interavia airlines is having financial problems at the time. Zvezda failed to fulfil four last fixtures.

Standings

Season results

Top goalscorers

See also
Russian Premier League 2008

References
 PFL

2
Russian First League seasons
Russia
Russia